Kirill Vasilievich Chistov (20 November 19192007) was a Soviet and Russian ethnologist.

Personal life
Kirill Vasilievich Chistov was born in Detskoe Selo, Russian SFSR on 20 November 1919.  His paternal grandfather was a railroad engineer who died young, and his maternal grandfather worked in military and civilian medicine before also dying young.  As a child, Chistov attended a school from which Nikolay Gumilyov graduated, and which was once directed by Innokenty Annensky.  After secondary school, he attended Leningrad State University and studied under Dmitry Konstantinovich Zelenin and Mark Azadovsky.  Chistov died in 2007.

Career
Chistov was an ethnologist who specialized in Slavic folklore, and was a corresponding member of the Russian Academy of Sciences.  In 2003, Chistov was awarded the S.F. Oldenburg Prize.

References

1919 births
2007 deaths
corresponding Members of the Russian Academy of Sciences
Russian ethnographers
Soviet ethnographers